André Lenz (born 19 November 1973) is a German former professional footballer who played as a goalkeeper.

Career as player
Lenz was born in Mülheim an der Ruhr. In 1990 he moved to Wuppertaler SV, where he was a professional from 1992. From 1992 to 1994 he played with Wuppertal in the 2. Bundesliga and then in the Regionalliga West/Südwest. He began his football career as a professional in 1999. Back then, he played for Alemannia Aachen in the 2. Bundesliga. In 2001, he signed a contract with Energie Cottbus, who were playing in the first division. In his second year for Energie, he played almost every match. After Energie was relegated in 2003, TSV 1860 Munich were interested in signing him, eventually he chose to sign. In 2004, it was confirmed that Lenz would be leaving 1860 Munich to join Bundesliga's VfL Wolfsburg. His Munich competitor Simon Jentzsch also went to the Wolves and Lenz had to be content with the place on the bench. 

After coach Felix Magath retired Jentzsch shortly before the winter break of the 2007/08 season, Lenz took over the number 1 position for three games. After the winter break, he stepped back into the second row behind newly signed Swiss international goalkeeper Diego Benaglio.

In April 2009, Lenz's contract was extended until 2010.

At the end of the 2008/09 season, VfL Wolfsburg became German champions for the first time in the club's history. It is also Lenz's first title success in professional football.

During the season he deputized for first-choice goalkeeper Benaglio in three full-time games and two more after substitutions. None of the encounters were lost. Also in the 2009/10 season, Lenz replaced Benaglio only when he was suspended and at the beginning of the second half of the season during a protracted injury. However, he sustained an ankle injury himself. The number three, Marwin Hitz, then took the place between the posts. Although Lenz went into the following season as nominal number two, Hitz was given preference when Benaglio suffered another long-term injury.

Lenz announced his retirement from active play following the conclusion of the 2012–13 Bundesliga season.

Assault
On 8 May 2010, Lenz was seriously injured during an altercation in a nightclub. He suffered multiple stab wounds and had an emergency surgery in a hospital.

Honours 
Bundesliga: 2008–09

References

1973 births
Living people
Sportspeople from Mülheim
Association football goalkeepers
German footballers
Bundesliga players
2. Bundesliga players
Wuppertaler SV players
Alemannia Aachen players
FC Energie Cottbus players
TSV 1860 Munich players
VfL Wolfsburg players
VfL Wolfsburg II players
Fulham F.C. non-playing staff
Footballers from North Rhine-Westphalia
Shandong Taishan F.C. non-playing staff
Association football goalkeeping coaches